St Aidan's Anglican Girls' School is an independent, Anglican, day school for girls, located in Corinda, a western suburb of Brisbane, Queensland, Australia. It was named after Aidan of Lindisfarne, an Irish saint.

Founded in 1929 by the Sisters of the Society of the Sacred Advent, the school has a non-selective enrolment policy and caters for approximately 800 students from Kindergarten to Year 12. Along with St Margaret's Anglican Girls School, it remains a school run by the Sisters of the Society of the Sacred Advent (part of the Anglican Diocese of Brisbane).

St Aidan's is affiliated with the Association of Heads of Independent Schools of Australia (AHISA), the Junior School Heads Association of Australia (JSHAA), the Alliance of Girls' Schools Australasia (AGSA), and has been a member of the Queensland Girls' Secondary Schools Sports Association (QGSSSA) since 1939.

Tradition 
St Aidan's was opened, in Corinda, on 4 February 1929, by Henry Frewen Le Fanu. Sister Elisabeth was Sister-in-Charge, Mrs Christine Hartland was Headmistress, and Canon W. E. C. Barrett was Chaplain; the house Barrett was named after his daughter Helen (1921–2019).

The initial enrolment, comprising kindergarten, first, third and fourth forms was 17, including one boy. This had risen to 42 by the end of the year, when Miss Sutton had joined the staff with students from her small school at Sherwood. Boys were admitted into SSA schools so that they could have an Anglican education before attending nearby Anglican Church Grammar School.

The depression years affected most church schools negatively but St Aidan's had 65 students by 1930 and 134 by 1934.

St Aidan's is said to have thrived under the inaugural Headmistress, Mrs Hartland. As Mrs Hartland said in later years, "the school and I grew together". She demanded uncompromising standards of behaviour and her sayings, "Use your initiative gels" and "A pennyworth of common sense is worth more than a pound of brain", became legendary.

The Sisters were fifty years ahead of time when they appointed a married woman to the position of Headmistress: at the time, State School teachers were forced to resign as soon as they married.

In 1948 the first Sister-in-Charge, Sister Lois, heralded the beginning of a 32-year period of St Aidan's having Sisters-in-Charge. For the previous 19 years the Sisters had always come out from the Community House to teach Divinity and to prepare students for confirmation. Overall the sisters' views of education were farsighted and progressive and they deplored any view which denigrated the value of education for girls. In Sister Lois' 1951 report, she stated "Girls must be equally educated as, at the very least, they will need trained, well-informed and keen minds to be capable mothers."

Sister Moira stressed the importance of parental involvement in student spiritual practices. Under her guidance, support for the Arts had grown, essential Senior School building works were under construction and Science subjects had received a much-needed boost.

Sister Helen Marie, succeeded Sister Moira in 1962 and, in 1964, the school saw a year of extraordinary building and academic change and expansion – plus increased enrolments. Sister Rachel's years saw much expansion and progress within the school in many aspects. The enrolment had risen to 312 at the start of 1965, which meant that the school needed an urgent building programme to provide further classrooms and she embarked on several projects. Sister Kathleen was supported by Sister Norma and Sister Bridget, and Sister Julian who acted as housekeeper for them at Broads.

A shyer personality with a keen sense of humour and highly organised, Miss Neil led St Aidan's for 12 years from 1980. A testament to her years of hard work and foresight is the Performing Arts Complex. By 1990 Miss Neil had seen the need for a strategic plan "for the next decade". This plan would encompass physical, academic and co-curricula development.  Her 12 years allowed her the time to implement her vision.

Mrs Patricia (Trish) Evans, came to the school in 1992. Her vision for St Aidan's included formulating and implementing a strategic plan, and enhancing administrative staff and student access to improved technology. Within an educational tradition of "Girls can do anything" and a strong Christian framework of caring for each other and the wider community, Mrs Evans ably led St Aidan's through change.

Mrs Spiller, a former teacher at St Margaret's, Hillbrook Anglican School, Deputy Principal of St Aidan's and mother of three, Mrs Spiller was a popular choice as the new principal for St Aidan's to herald the new century. "My vision for St Aidan's is to be the school of choice for the parent and daughter who want an all round education: academic as well as community service, leadership, music, sport, debating, all embedded in a strong Christian context (1999)." Mrs Spiller has guided through the development and enhancement of the Junior School facilities, the creation of the Science and Technology building, and the redevelopment of the Performing Arts Centre (PAC), to be known as The Christine Hartland Centre (completed mid-2010) and extension of the Junior School (completed mid-2010).

House system 
As with most Australian schools, St Aidan's utilises a house system. The school has six houses:

Notable alumni

 Kate Carnell (1972), former Chief Minister ACT, executive director Australian Division General Practitioners, chief executive officer of the Australian General Practice Network; recipient of the Centenary Medal 2003
 Gayle Mayes (1973), Olympian
 Kate Miller-Heidke (1998), singer-songwriter
 Geraldine Moses (1980), consulting pharmacist and professor of pharmacy

See also
Lists of schools in Queensland
Education in Australia

Notes and references
Notes

References

External links 
 

Girls' schools in Queensland
Educational institutions established in 1929
Junior School Heads Association of Australia Member Schools
Anglican schools in Brisbane
Corinda, Queensland
1929 establishments in Australia
Alliance of Girls' Schools Australasia